Kameng may refer to:

 Kameng Elephant Reserve, an elephant reserve in Northeast India
 Kameng River, Arunachal Pradesh in Northeast India
 East Kameng District, Arunachal Pradesh
 West Kameng District, Arunachal Pradesh
 Kameng Dolo, Indian politician